= Tatón =

Coordinates: 27°20′S 67°34′W

- Municipality and village
- Interactive map of Tatón
- Country: Argentina
- Province: Catamarca Province
- Time zone: UTC−3 (ART)

Tatón is a village and municipality in Catamarca Province in northwestern Argentina.
